Ningthoujam Pritam Singh (born 1 April 1993) is an Indian professional footballer who plays as a forward for I-League club TRAU.

Career

Sporting Clube de Goa
In June 2011, Singh signed for Sporting Clube de Goa who were then in the I-League. He then made his debut for Sporting Goa on 9 November 2011 against Pailan Arrows in the I-League.

NEROCA
After stints with 2013 I-League second division side Mumbai Tigers and the historic Mohammedan SC, the forward signed for NEROCA in 2016. He also represented Gokulam Kerala in the 2018–19 season but returned to the Manipuri club after a lacklustre stint. Earlier this year on February 8, the 27-year-old created history by becoming the first player to score a hat-trick in the Imphal derby in the I-League. He scored three in the second half in NEROCA's 5–0 win over local rivals TRAU as over 34,000 people were in attendance to witness the feat.

Mohammedan
In June 2022, Singh joined I-League club Mohammedan. On 16 August, he scored on his debut against Goa in the Durand Cup, which ended in a 3–1 comeback win. On 10 January 2023, Singh's contract was terminated by mutual agreement with immediate effect.

Career statistics

Club

References

External links
 Profile at Goal.com

Indian footballers
1993 births
Living people
Footballers from Manipur
I-League players
Sporting Clube de Goa players
Mumbai Tigers FC players
Association football forwards
NEROCA FC players
Gokulam Kerala FC players
Mohammedan SC (Kolkata) players
Rajasthan United FC players